Sarcomyxa edulis is a species of fungus in the family Sarcomyxaceae. Fruit bodies grow as ochraceous to ochraceous-brown, overlapping fan- or oyster-shaped caps on the wood of deciduous trees. The gills on the underside are closely spaced, ochraceous, and have an adnate attachment to the stipe. Spores are smooth, amyloid, and measure 4.5–6 by 1–2 µm.

The species was previously confused with the greenish-capped Sarcomyxa serotina which is bitter-tasting. Sarcomyxa edulis is mild-tasting and edible. In Japan, where it is called mukitake, it is considered "one of the most delicious edible mushrooms" and a system has recently been developed to cultivate the mushroom in plastic greenhouses. In China, it is called “元蘑/yuanmo,” “黄蘑/huangmo,” or “冻蘑/dongmo”. It is considered a delicacy in China, rich in nutrition. "Generally, it grows on the fallen woods of broad-leaved trees in remote mountains and old forests, but not all broad-leaved trees are suitable for its growth, and the rotten basswood is very easy to grow S. edulis". "S. edulisis distributed in provinces of Hebei, Heilongjiang, Jilin, Shanxi, Guangxi, northern Shaanxi, Sichuan" in China, and at present, China already has high yield cultivation techniques.

Sarcomyxa edulis is known to occur in China, Japan, and the Russian Far East.

References

Fungi described in 2003
Fungi of Asia
Edible fungi
fungi in cultivation